U.S. Route 20 (US 20) in the U.S. state of Illinois is a major arterial highway that runs from the Iowa state line at East Dubuque at the northwestern tip of Illinois, to the Indiana state line at Chicago south of the Chicago Skyway, a distance of . For its entire length, US 20 is designated as the General Ulysses S. Grant Highway, often abbreviated the U.S. Grant Memorial Highway. However, this name is only commonly used west of Elgin. US 20 bypasses the city of Elgin on a freeway known as the Elgin Bypass or Dr. Martin Luther King Jr. Memorial Highway. From Elgin to Melrose Park, US 20 follows Lake Street. It then  follows Mannheim Road, and further south La Grange Road. US 20  also follows 95th Street as it turns east through Chicago's southwestern suburbs. It ultimately leaves Illinois on Indianapolis Boulevard.

Route description

Northwest Illinois

As the highway enters Illinois across the Julien Dubuque Bridge, it continues southeasterly for a while, paralleling the Upper Mississippi River before turning east into the rugged country of the Driftless Area in Jo Daviess County, then turning flat and straight west of Stockton, Illinois and entering Stephenson County. The Ulysses S. Grant Home, a national landmark, fronts near the highway at the eastern edge of Galena, Illinois.

The road between Dubuque and Stockton was once known as the most dangerous stretch of road because of the hills and curves flanked by cliffs and valleys. Travelers were greeted with signs reminding them to drive carefully as they entered this stretch of road.

In Freeport, US 20 is routed onto a limited-access freeway bypass. Between Freeport and Rockford there are two traffic light-controlled intersections. The Rockford bypass routes US 20 onto a full limited-access freeway; it remains this way until it overlaps I-39 southeast of downtown Rockford.

Rockford to Elgin
East of Rockford, the routing of US 20 runs parallel with I-90; US 20 serves minor cities that are not accessible from the Jane Addams Memorial Tollway. It is a four-lane divided highway from I-39 to just east of Belvidere; for the rest of this segment, it is a winding, rural two-lane road.

US 20 travels through the downtowns of the small towns and unincorporated areas of Garden Prairie, Harmony and Starks, as well as the city of Marengo. At Starks, eastbound US 20 overlaps southbound Illinois Route 47 and westbound Illinois Route 72, forming a wrong-way concurrency. All three routes pass beneath a railroad viaduct before separating south of Starks.

Continuing east, US 20 travels through Pingree Grove before entering the Elgin area. Before entering Elgin, US 20 widens to a four lane limited-access freeway that bypasses Elgin, around the town's south end. This road is known as the Elgin Bypass.

Elgin to Indiana

At the end of the Elgin bypass, US 20 takes on the name of Lake Street.  US 20 has numerous high-volume intersections, including a grade-separated interchange with Illinois Route 59. In Hanover Park, an early-2000s reconstruction project widened lanes on the road and created a median for safer travel; east of Barrington Road / County Farm Road, the road briefly becomes six lanes for one mile (1.6 km) until the Elgin–O'Hare Expressway.

US 20 continues in an east-southeast direction through the town center of Bloomingdale and becomes six lanes at the Bloomingdale-Roselle border. It maintains six lanes through a very high traffic corridor to Interstate 290 and onwards to Illinois Route 53 before it returns to four lanes while serving downtown Addison, paralleling Interstate 290 to the north. Past Elmhurst, the road overlaps Interstate 290 for a mile.

US 20 continues through Stone Park and Melrose Park before turning south and joining U.S. Routes 12/45 on Mannheim Road. In La Grange, the combined U.S. 12, 20, and 45 traveling on La Grange Road intersect with Ogden Avenue, which carries U.S. 34, one of the few places where four US numbered highways intersect. La Grange Road continues south until U.S. 20 turns onto 95th Street eastbound with U.S. 12. This combination later joins with U.S. Route 41, where the three routes follow Ewing Avenue and Indianapolis Boulevard, which are the last portions of US 20 prior to its crossing the state line into Indiana.

History
The routing of US 20 has not changed since 1938. Prior to 1938, US 20 continued east on Lake Street east of Mannheim Road (US 12/US 45). It ran through downtown Chicago and exited Chicago south on what is now Torrence Avenue. In 1955, the Illinois General Assembly designated the entire length of US 20 in Illinois the "U.S. Grant Memorial Highway". New signs were produced in late 2007 to reflect this designation along its entire length.

Elgin Bypass
Construction of the Golf Road (Illinois Route 58) extension to Summit Street in Elgin was completed in 1932. In 1958, Interstate 90 (I-90) was built through the north side of Elgin extending east to Devon Avenue, and on to Chicago by 1960. In 1935, concerned about increasing numbers of traffic, residents of Elgin laid plans to build a bypass. US 20 had been routed down Villa Street, Highland Avenue, and Larkin Avenue through downtown Elgin. 27 years later, a section of freeway opened south of Elgin as the Elgin Bypass.

The segment of the Elgin Bypass between McLean Boulevard and Grace Street (Illinois Route 25), including the Fox River bridge, was opened first. Later, the outer segments of the bypass – to Randall Road on the west, and Bluff City Boulevard on the east – were opened. On November 30, 1962, Governor Otto Kerner Jr. dedicated the Elgin Bypass.

From 1962 until 1984, the old route was designated as US 20 Business.

In 2012-2016, the interchange between the Elgin Bypass and McLean Blvd was upgraded to a SPUI, the bridge was widened and replaced and portions of the Bypass were repaved at a cost of $44.4 million.

In 2019, the interchange between the Elgin Bypass and Randall Road received a $9 million upgrade so that northbound Randall Road traffic can enter the eastbound Elgin Bypass without making a left turn at a traffic light.

Starting in 2014, a comprehensive study of the Elgin Bypass corridor resulted in a number of recommendations including a wider bridge across the Fox River, a replacement bridge for IL-31 crossing the bypass and replacement of other bridges.  The 2019 estimates of the recommended improvements total $84 million, with $10.6 million designated for the IL-31 bridge.

Future
Long range plans call for US 20 to be upgraded to a four lane highway from Rockford to East Dubuque. The project dates back to the 1970s, when a major supplemental freeway system was proposed in Illinois. US 20 has been completed as a four lane freeway/expressway combination between Rockford and Freeport as well as Galena and East Dubuque. The remaining gap between Freeport and Galena is planned to be filled, but efforts have stalled in recent years, mainly due to funding issues.

Major intersections

Business routes

US 20 has been rerouted around the cities of Freeport, Rockford, Elgin and Chicago. A bypass is currently planned for Galena.

The longest Business US 20 in Illinois runs  from just west of Rockford to just east of Belvidere.  The route begins just west of Weldon Road and runs as State Street into downtown Rockford, where it is split into two one-way streets (Chestnut Street and Walnut Street for eastbound traffic, Jefferson Street for westbound traffic).  The route continues east along State Street all the way through Rockford and becomes a two-lane highway between Rockford and Belvidere.  Business US 20 is then routed in an outer loop around the city of Belvidere before merging back with US 20 near Genoa Road and I-90.

Business US 20 in Elgin was removed in 1984. This ran along Larkin Avenue, Highland Avenue, Chicago Street and Villa Avenue. The current routing of US 20 south of Elgin is called the Elgin Bypass.

Business US 20 in Chicago was removed in 1968. This existed from 1960 through 1968; before then, it was City US 20 from 1938 to 1960.

See also

Stagecoach Trail

References

External links

 Project study page

20
 Illinois
Transportation in Jo Daviess County, Illinois
Transportation in Stephenson County, Illinois
Transportation in Winnebago County, Illinois
Transportation in Boone County, Illinois
Transportation in McHenry County, Illinois
Transportation in Kane County, Illinois
Transportation in DuPage County, Illinois
Transportation in Cook County, Illinois
Transportation in Chicago